The Roman Catholic Diocese of Mymensingh is a diocese located in the city of Mymensingh in the Ecclesiastical province of Dhaka in Bangladesh. Bishop Ponen Paul Kubi, CSC, DD is head of the Diocese of Mymensingh. Most of the people in this Diocese are from Garo tribal community. Bishop is also a Garo tribal. A total of 76,047  Catholics and 6665 Protestant Christians live here.  People live on farming, day laborer in rural area and many people live in cities as migrant workers. Female Garo are very skill in beauty parlor profession.

History
Mymensingh Diocese was part of Dhaka Archdiocese before in 1987.  It was created by Pope John Paul II. Rev. Bishop  Francis A Gomes was the first bishop in the Diocese of Mymensingh. 
 
In 1909, five Garo leaders made a long trip down to Dhaka to ask the Catholic Bishops to send them a priest. A year later, Arch Bishop sent Fr. Fleury CSC and Brother Eugene CSC to study the situation.

In late 1910 and early 1911, Rev. Fr. Adolphe Francis CSC began the work in Tausalpara near Ranikhong. On 19 March 1911, Father Francis reaped the first fruits with 21 Catholic baptisms at Tausalpara. The first church among the Garos was built at Tausalpara in 1912, and in 1913 Rev. Fr. Francis began living there. In 1915, he moved to the Ranikhong hill where Ranikhong Parish is now.

Until 1918, Father Francis was practically always alone, tramping the Garo country from east to west, covering the 90 miles strip of territory, where in the following twenty-five years a total of six parishes were established.

On Christmas Day 2003, Rev. Fr. Ponen Paul Kubi CSC (at the time Director of the Pobitra Krush Sadhana Griha, Rampura, Dhaka) was appointed Auxiliary Bishop of Mymensingh and consecrated in Mymensingh on 13 February 2004. On 15 July 2006, Bishop Ponen Paul Kubi CSC was appointed Second Bishop of Mymensingh by Pope Benedict XVI. The Installation ceremony was held on September 1, 2006.

Bishops
 Bishops of Mymensingh (Roman rite)
 Bishop Francis Anthony Gomes (May 15, 1987 – July 15, 2006)
 Bishop Paul Ponen Kubi, C.S.C. (July 15, 2006 – present)

Notable personalities
 Advocate Late Promode Mankin, MP, State Minister for Ministry of Social Welfare

References
 GCatholic.org
 Catholic Hierarchy
   
 Diocese of Mymensingh

Roman Catholic dioceses in Bangladesh
Christian organizations established in 1987
Roman Catholic dioceses and prelatures established in the 20th century
Mymensingh, Roman Catholic Diocese of